Lene Vilsgaard is a former women's cricketer for the Denmark women's national cricket team who played three ODIs during the 1999 Women's European Cricket Championship. In all, she scored three runs and took three wickets for Denmark.

References

Danish women cricketers
Denmark women One Day International cricketers
Living people
Year of birth missing (living people)